Trapper Lake may refer to:

Trapper Lake (Alaska)
Trapper Lake (Chelan County, Washington) in North Cascades National Park
Trapper Lake (Teton County, Wyoming) in Grand Teton National Park